Bapatla East (rural) is a village in Guntur district of the Indian state of Andhra Pradesh. It is located in Bapatla mandal of Tenali revenue division.

Geography 

Governance 

Bapatla East gram panchayat is the local self-government of the village. It is divided into wards and each ward is represented by a ward member.

Education 

As per the school information report for the academic year 2018–19, the village has a total of 24 schools. These include 8 Zilla/Mandal Parishad, 14 private and 2 other type of schools.

See also 
Bapatla West
List of villages in Guntur district

References 

Villages in Guntur district